Fencote railway station was a railway station on the Worcester, Bromyard and Leominster Railway in Hatfield and Newhampton, Herefordshire, England.

Opening
Opened as part of the final section of the Worcester, Bromyard and Leominster Railway, the railway was bought out of bankruptcy by the Great Western Railway in 1888, who completed the line in 1897.

Closure
After the Second World War, and with the greater use of the motorbus and private cars, traffic on the line fell considerably. Unstaffed as a station from September 1949, the line closed to regular passenger services on 15 September 1952.

The 50 society members and passengers rode on the last train that would run on the complete track before it was removed. The Worcester to Bromyard section, kept open for the storage of disused and soon to be scrapped railway wagons, was closed under the Beeching Axe in 1964.

Present
In 1980, Fencote was bought by an ex-railway employee and restored as a private residence. The signal box has since been restored, and sections of the track either side of station have been re-installed. In 1984, neighbouring station  was bought and restored. Both sites are occasionally open for public access and viewing, but without operational trains.

References

Further reading

Disused railway stations in Herefordshire
Former Great Western Railway stations
Railway stations in Great Britain opened in 1897
Railway stations in Great Britain closed in 1952